The Aquifoliales are an order of flowering plants, including the Aquifoliaceae (holly) family, and also the Helwingiaceae (2-5 species of temperate Asian shrubs) and the Phyllonomaceae (4 species of Central American trees and shrubs). In 2001, the families Stemonuraceae and Cardiopteridaceae were added to this order. This circumscription of Aquifoliales was recognized by the Angiosperm Phylogeny Group when they published the APG II system in 2003. In the Cronquist system, there is no Aquifoliales order: the Aquifoliaceae are placed within the order Celastrales and the others are in other families.

References 

 
Angiosperm orders